The 2022 WNBL Finals was the postseason tournament of the WNBL's 2021–22 season. The Southside Flyers were the defending champions, however they failed to qualify for the finals series. The WNBL Finals schedule was announced 10 March 2022. The Melbourne Boomers won their second championship, defeating Perth in the Grand Final series, 2–1.

Standings

Bracket

Semi-finals

(1) Melbourne Boomers vs. (4) Adelaide Lightning

(2) Perth Lynx  vs. (3) Canberra Capitals 

Notes
 Perth-Canberra semi-final was not able to be played as a best-of-three series due to a COVID-19 outbreak in the Canberra team. After Game 2 in Canberra was cancelled, it was initially postponed to a best-of-two series determined by points spread. However the rescheduled Game 2 in Perth was also cancelled after Canberra were unable to field a team. Perth advanced to the Grand Final with a 1–0 series win.

Grand Final

(1) Melbourne Boomers vs. (2) Perth Lynx

Rosters

References 

Women's National Basketball League Finals
Finals